In orbital mechanics, a Lissajous orbit, named after Jules Antoine Lissajous, is a quasi-periodic orbital trajectory that an object can follow around a Lagrangian point of a three-body system with minimal propulsion. Lyapunov orbits around a Lagrangian point are curved paths that lie entirely in the plane of the two primary bodies. In contrast, Lissajous orbits include components in this plane and perpendicular to it, and follow a Lissajous curve. Halo orbits also include components perpendicular to the plane, but they are periodic, while Lissajous orbits are usually not.

As a result, spacecraft in these Lagrangian point orbits must use their propulsion systems to perform orbital station-keeping. Although they are not perfectly stable, a modest effort of station keeping keeps a spacecraft in a desired Lissajous orbit for a long time.

The natural dynamics keep the spacecraft (or natural celestial body) in the vicinity of the Lagrangian point without use of a propulsion system, even when slightly perturbed from equilibrium. These orbits can however be destabilized by other nearby massive objects.

Spacecraft using Lissajous orbits

Several missions have used Lissajous orbits: ACE at Sun–Earth L1, SOHO at Sun–Earth L1, DSCOVR at Sun–Earth L1, WMAP at Sun–Earth L2, and also the Genesis mission collecting solar particles at L1.
On 14 May 2009, the European Space Agency (ESA) launched into space the Herschel and Planck observatories, both of which use Lissajous orbits at Sun–Earth L2.
ESA's current  Gaia mission also uses a Lissajous orbit at Sun–Earth L2.
In 2011, NASA transferred two of its THEMIS spacecraft from Earth orbit to Lunar orbit by way of Earth–Moon L1 and L2 Lissajous orbits.
In June 2018, Queqiao, the relay satellite for China's Chang'e 4 lunar lander mission, entered orbit around Earth-Moon L2.

Fictional appearances
In the 2005 science fiction novel Sunstorm by Arthur C. Clarke and Stephen Baxter, a huge shield is constructed in space to protect the Earth from a deadly solar storm. In the story a group of wealthy and powerful people shelter opposite the shield at  so as to be protected from the solar storm by the shield, the Earth and the Moon.

In the 2017 science fiction novel Artemis by Andy Weir, a Lissajous orbit is used as a transfer point for routine travel to and from the moon.

Notes

See also
 Libration point orbit

References

External links
 

Three-body orbits
Trigonometry
Lagrangian mechanics